James Adam (born 13 May 1931) is a Scottish former footballer who played in the Football League for Aston Villa, Luton Town and Stoke City.

Career
Born in Blantyre, Adam began his career with local youth club Blantyre Celtic before moving south to English club Aldershot in 1950. However, the young Adam was only able to make a single league appearance for the club during the 1950–51 season and then left and joined non-league Spennymoor United.

In 1953, Adam signed for Luton Town, where he made 138 appearances during a six-year spell in which he helped the club gain promotion to the First Division in 1954–55. By the time of  Luton's relegation from the First Division in 1960, Adam had joined Aston Villa, where he spent two seasons before signing for Stoke City where he spent the 1961–62 season scoring seven goals in 24 appearances before returning to Scotland with Falkirk. He later emigrated to Australia, where he played for South Melbourne Hellas.

Career statistics
Source:

References

External links
 
 Aston Villa Player Database

1931 births
Living people
Association football midfielders
Scottish footballers
Aldershot F.C. players
Spennymoor United F.C. players
Luton Town F.C. players
Aston Villa F.C. players
Stoke City F.C. players
Falkirk F.C. players
South Melbourne FC players
English Football League players
Scottish Football League players
Scottish Junior Football Association players
Scottish expatriate footballers
Scottish expatriate sportspeople in Australia
Footballers from South Lanarkshire
People from Blantyre, South Lanarkshire